Aloisio the New, known in Russian as Aleviz Novyi or Aleviz Fryazin, was an Italian Renaissance architect invited by Ivan III to work in Moscow. Some Italian scholars have attempted to identify him with the Venetian sculptor Alvise Lamberti da Montagnana, but the point is still widely disputed.

On his way to Russia, Aloisio was captured by Meñli I Giray, the khan of Crimea. At the khan's court, Aloisio built some sections of the famous palace in Bakhchisaray. The Italianate carved portal of the palace is particularly noteworthy.

In 1504 he finally arrived in Moscow, with a letter of recommendation from the khan.
He became known to Russians as Aleviz the New, to distinguish him from his namesake, who had been working at the Kremlin since 1494. Aloisio's first and principal work in Moscow was the Archangel Cathedral, the burial place of Muscovite monarchs. The cathedral's elaborate Renaissance ornamentation was extensively copied throughout 16th-century Russia.

Aloisio the New was last mentioned in 1514, when he was entrusted by Vasily III to build 11 churches in Moscow. Although only parts of these structures have been preserved, there is enough evidence to assume that they were built in strikingly differing styles. The best preserved of these churches is the katholikon of the Vysokopetrovsky Monastery in Moscow (1514–17), considered the earliest rotunda in Russia.

Notes

Russian architects
Renaissance architects
16th century in Moscow
16th-century Italian architects
Italian emigrants to Russia